Borneosicyos is a genus of flowering plants belonging to the family Cucurbitaceae.

Its native range is Borneo.

Species:

Borneosicyos simplex

References

Cucurbitaceae
Cucurbitaceae genera